El hombre inquieto (English: "The Restless Man") is a 1954 Mexican film. It stars Sara García and German Valdés.

Plot
A poor newspaper-selling man, Germán, is hired by a greedy man, Roque, to impersonate the long dead son of a wealthy Arab, Cain Rafful. While doing so, Germán falls in love with Cain Rafful's only daughter, Elena, who is the girlfriend of Roque. When Mr. Rafful discovers the scam, he still accepts Germán as his adopted son and allows him to marry his daughter.

External links
 

1954 films
Mexican comedy-drama films
1950s Spanish-language films
Mexican black-and-white films
1950s Mexican films